Petr Sklenička (born 1 February 1964 in Česká Lípa) is a Czech University Lecturer in Environmental Science. He has been Rector of the Czech University of Life Sciences Prague (CZU) since February 2018.

Life and Work 
On the foundation of the Faculty of Environmental Science in 2007 Sklenička became Dean and remained in this position until 2014. From 2014 until 2018 he was Vice Rector for Science and Research at the CZU.
Sklenička held seminars and tutorials on the theme of soil- and landscape protection, in particular land management and landscape ecology. Since 2005 he has at the same time taught at the Czech Technical University in Prague (CVUT). For six months in 2006 he taught as Guest Professor of Land Management and Natural Resources at Utah State University (USA).
At the end of January beginning of February 2018 Sklenička took over the Rectorship of the CZU from Jiří Balík. In October 2021, he was reelected as the Rector for a second term.

Publications 
 Ca. 200 scientific publications on Landscape and Town Planning; Land Use Policy; Applied Energy.

References

External links 
 Webpage of CULS Prague

Living people
Scientists from Prague
Czech environmentalists
Academic staff of the Czech University of Life Sciences Prague
Rectors of universities in the Czech Republic
1964 births
People from Česká Lípa